Hyden is a surname. Notable people with the surname include:

John Hyden (born 1972), American volleyball player
Steven Hyden (born 1977), American music critic
Tiffany Hyden (born 1980), American ice dancer

See also
Hayden (surname)
Hyde (surname)